Mount Rose is a narrow section of the Rocky Hill Ridge in Hopewell Township, New Jersey which is 420 feet above sea level.  The ridge's western end is at The Sourlands at Hopewell-Pennington Road and its eastern end is near Province Line Road.  The ridge is a diabase intrusion and unlike many of the ridges in the state, it runs from northwest to southeast. Crusher Road travels along the ridge.  Pennington-Rocky Hill Road, Cherry Valley Road, Hopewell-Princeton Road and Carter Road meet at a low point along the ridge at the village of  Mount Rose.

Hiking trails
The Elks Trail- 1 mile trail off Crusher Road
The Mount Rose Trails- This preserve has five trail options: The Ridge Trail, Forest Loop, East Loop, West Loop and Cattail Trail

References

Landforms of Mercer County, New Jersey
Rose
Igneous petrology of New Jersey